Ūkio Bankas was a Lithuanian commercial bank based in Kaunas. More than 50% of shares are owned by Lithuanian businessman Vladimir Romanov who therefore is in the control of the bank. It was the fifth largest and oldest private bank in Lithuania.

In October 2006, during an internet conference on the news portal Delfi.lt Vladimir Romanov announced his plans of selling his shares to the strategic investor. GE Money, a branch of General Electric, as one of the possible buyers was mentioned by Romanov.

In common with other banks Ūkio Bankas suffered from the effects of credit crunch and on 26 August 2008, rating agency Standard & Poor downgraded the banks status from stable to negative.

The organisation sponsored Lithuanian football club FBK Kaunas and Scottish team Hearts.  Romanov was the owner of Hearts and a board member of FBK Kaunas.

Ūkio bankas has been associated with money laundering known as the ŪkioLeaks or Troika Laundromat. Reported by Organized Crime and Corruption Reporting Project (OCCRP) as the Russian Laundering Machine on 22 November 2011, Ūkio bankas used Sergey Magnitsky's stolen Hermitage Capital Management subsidiaries HSBC Guernsey Ltd, OOO Rilend, OOO Parfenion, and OOO Markhaon to finance through Bristoll, Nomirex and Tormex, Al-Shabaab's Russian weapons built by Ukraine and pro Kremlin South Sudan militants weapons transfers from Ukraine. Sergei Roldugin was a client during this money laundering scheme.

Arnis Lagzdins was the compliance official at Ukio Bankas during the money laundering and had previously held the same position at Parex Bank in Latvia when very large sums were money laundered allegedly through Parex Bank and its sister firm Overseas Services by Vladimir Putin, Yuri Chaika, and the Russian Mafia including the Tambovskaya Organized Crime Group which looted various governments according to Spanish prosecutors.

In February 2013, the bank was revealed to have poor asset quality, weak risk management and lack of proper operating data. The check also revealed that the bank has ignored the central bank's recommendation to reduce operating risks. On 12 February, the Bank of Lithuania in accordance with Art. 76 of the Law on Banks of the Republic of Lithuania (the “Law on Banks”) announced a partial and temporal restriction on activities (the “Moratorium”) of AB Ūkio bankas. Ukio was removed from the Lithuanian stock exchange later that month, with many of its assets and liabilities transferred to Šiaulių bankas.

See also
Economy of Lithuania
Parex Bank

Notes

References

External links

Banks established in 1989
Defunct banks of Lithuania
Banks disestablished in 2013
2013 disestablishments in Lithuania
Lithuanian companies established in 1989